= Francesco Bovini =

Italian painter

Francesco Bovini was an Italian painter who was active in Ferrara. He painted two altarpieces for the church of the Oratorio della Penitenza in Ferrara, one representing the Immaculate Conception and the other, the Adoration of the Magi.
